Conchylia is a genus of moths in the family Geometridae.

Species
 Conchylia actena Prout, 1917
 Conchylia albata Janse, 1934
 Conchylia alternata Warren, 1901
 Conchylia canescens Prout, 1925
 Conchylia decorata Warren, 1911
 Conchylia ditissimaria Guenée, 1858
 Conchylia frosinaria Stoll, 1790
 Conchylia gamma Prout, 1915
 Conchylia interstincta Prout, 1923
 Conchylia irene Prout, 1915
 Conchylia lamellata Prout, 1917
 Conchylia lapsicolumna Prout, 1916
 Conchylia nitidula Stoll, 1782
 Conchylia nymphula Janse, 1934
 Conchylia pactolaria Wallengren, 1872
 Conchylia rhabdocampa Prout, 1935
 Conchylia sesquifascia Prout, 1913

References
 Conchylia at Markku Savela's Lepidoptera and Some Other Life Forms
  Retrieved April 20, 2018.

Larentiinae